Sandile may refer to
 Sandile (name)
Sandile (Pokémon), a fifth-generation Pokémon species
Sandile Dam in South Africa
Sandile Decoration in Ciskei, South Africa
Sandile Medal in Ciskei, South Africa

People 

 Mgolombane Sandile (1820–1878), South African Chief
 Sandile Decoration in Ciskei, South Africa
 Sandile Medal in Ciskei, South Africa
 Emma Sandile (1842-1892), South African land owner, daughter of Mgolombane
 Maxhob'ayakhawuleza Sandile (1956–2011), South African royalty, descendant of Mgolombane
 Sandile Dam in South Africa, named after Maxhob'ayakhawuleza
 Noloyiso Sandile (1963–2020), South African royal
 Jonguxolo Sandile (born 1992), South African royalty, descendant of Mgolombane